Steffi Annys (born 10 May 1988) is a Belgian badminton player. She competed at the 2015 European Games.

Achievements

BWF International Challenge/Series 
Women's doubles

  BWF International Challenge tournament
  BWF International Series tournament
  BWF Future Series tournament

References

External links 
 

1988 births
Living people
People from De Panne
Sportspeople from West Flanders
Belgian female badminton players
Badminton players at the 2015 European Games
European Games competitors for Belgium
21st-century Belgian women